Eucalyptus saxatilis, commonly known as the Suggan Buggan mallee or Mount Wheeler mallee, is a species of mallee or small tree that is endemic to southeastern Australia. It has smooth bark that is shed in ribbons, lance-shaped to curved adult leaves, flower buds in groups of three, white flowers and bell-shaped fruit.

Description
It has smooth, slightly powdery grey-green bark that is shed in short ribbons. Flowering has been observed in March and August and the flowers are white.

Taxonomy and 
Eucalyptus saxatilis was first formally described by James Barrie Kirkpatrick and Ian Brooker in Australian Forest Research in 1977 from material collected by Brooker at Little River Gorge in the Snowy River National Park in 1975. The specific epithet (saxatilis) is a Latin word meaning "dwelling or found among rocks".

Distribution and habitat
Suggan Buggan mallee grows in rocky sites in a few locations near the border between far north-eastern Victoria and south-eastern New South Wales, including the Little River Gorge, Stradbroke Chasm and Mount Wheeler.

Conservation
Eucalyptus saxatilis was one of eleven species selected for the Save a Species Walk campaign in April 2016; scientists walked 300 km to raise money for collection of seeds to be prepared and stored at the Australian PlantBank at the Australian Botanic Garden, Mount Annan.

See also

List of Eucalyptus species

References

Flora of New South Wales
Flora of Victoria (Australia)
Trees of Australia
saxatilis
Myrtales of Australia
Taxa named by Ian Brooker
Plants described in 1977